Aspen is a given name and a surname. It may refer to:

 Aspen Ladd (born 1995), American mixed martial artist
 Aspen Mays (born 1980), American artist
 Aspen Vincent (born 1975), American Broadway actress, voice actress, and pop singer
 Bert Aspen (born 1934), British former wrestler
 Brian Aspen (born 1959), British retired wrestler
 Jennifer Aspen (born 1973), American actress

English-language feminine given names
Given names derived from plants or flowers